The Lagrange-CRT Foundation Prize  is an annual International award created by the CRT Foundation with the scientific coordination of the ISI Foundation.  The prize is awarded for scientific research in the field of complexity sciences, its applications and dissemination.
The Lagrange Prize is awarded in Turin, Italy.

Aim and Criteria

The Lagrange-CRT Foundation Prize is awarded to a selected scientist (below 
50 years of age) for achievements in research on complex systems, including
theoretical and experimental research. In 
particular, the prize recognizes outstanding contributions relevant to the 
progress of complexity science.

The Prize

The winner of the Lagrange-CRT Foundation Prize is chosen by the Scientific Commission in collaboration with the ISI Foundation. The prize is in the amount of €50,000. The award ceremony takes place in Turin.

List of Winners
2020 Corona-Researchers at the Institute for Scientific Interchange
2019 Iain Couzin , David Gruber 
2018 Cesar Hidalgo
2017 Danielle Bassett 
2016 John Brownstein 
2015 Panos Ipeirotis , Jure Leskovec 
2014 Mark Newman  
2013 Duncan J. Watts  
2012 Lada Adamic , Xavier Gabaix 
2011  Albert-László Barabási 
2010   James J. Collins 
2009 Giorgio Parisi 
2008   Yakov G. Sinai , W. Brian Arthur

Special Prize for Diffusion and Promotion of the Culture of Complexity
2013 Riccardo Luna
2009 Mark Buchanan
2008 Philip Ball

References

External links 
 List of Winners on CRT Foundation website 
  List of Winners on ISI Foundation website 

Science competitions
Science and technology in Italy